Buyeo Ubok (扶餘優福, ? – ?) a member of the royal family of Baekje, one of the Three Kingdoms of Korea. He was a son of descendant of the 6th king, Gusu of Baekje.

The Samguk Sagi records:

In 321 he was appointed Minister of the Interior (Naeshinjoapyung, 內臣佐平).

In 327 he started a rebellion against his "half-brother" Biryu and took control of the fortresses north of the Han River. The king dispatched soldiers to attack him and the rebellion was stopped.

Family
 Father: Gusu of Baekje - this is controversial but he is at least a descendant of Gusu.
 Mother: unknown
 Brother: Buyeo Sai (扶餘沙伊, ?–234) - first son, 7th King of Baekje, Saban of Baekje.
 Brother: Buyeo Biryu (扶餘比流, ?–344) - 11th King of Baekje, Biryu of Baekje; recorded as son of Gusu in the Samguk Sagi but because of date discrepancies scholars now believe he was a grandson of Gusu.
 Wife: unknown
 Children: unknown

Notes

References
 Hong, Wontack. (1994). Paekche of Korea and the Origin of Yamato Japan. Seoul: Kudara International.
 http://gias.snu.ac.kr/wthong/
 https://web.archive.org/web/20080827190959/http://www.himemiko.info/2006/01/
 https://web.archive.org/web/20071113135549/http://www.kansai.gr.jp/culture_e/ibunka/monuments/siga/index.html

See also
History of Korea
Three Kingdoms of Korea

Baekje people
Year of birth unknown
4th-century Korean people